Igizeh is an album by Banco de Gaia. It was released on September 26, 2000 on Six Degrees Records.

Track listing

References

2000 albums
Banco de Gaia albums
Six Degrees Records albums